Khalifehha (also Romanized as Khalīfehhā) is a village in Howmeh Rural District, in the Central District of Lamerd County, Fars Province, Iran. At the 2006 census, its population was 164, in 32 families.

References 

Populated places in Lamerd County